= MAFD1 =

Genetic element in the species Homo sapiens

Identifiers
- Aliases: MAFD1, BPAD, MD1, major affective disorder 1
- External IDs: GeneCards: MAFD1; OMA:MAFD1 - orthologs
Orthologs
Species	Human	Mouse
Entrez	4095	n/a
Ensembl	n/a	n/a
UniProt	n a	n/a
RefSeq (mRNA)	n/a	n/a
RefSeq (protein)	n/a	n/a
Location (UCSC)	n/a	n/a
PubMed search		n/a
- Wikidata
View/Edit Human

Major affective disorder 1 is a protein that in humans is encoded by the MAFD1 gene.
